Park Si-eun (born August 1, 2001) is a South Korean singer and actress. After debuting as a child actress in 2014, she starred in several television series and films, winning the award for Best Young Actress at the 2018 SBS Drama Awards for her role as young Woo Seo-ri in Still 17. She was both an actor and idol trainee in JYP Entertainment, but left the company in 2019 after JYP Actors became defunct. After signing with High Up Entertainment in December 2019, she debuted as a member of the girl group STAYC in November 2020.

Filmography

Film

Television series

Television show

Hosting

Awards and nominations

References

External links
 
 

2001 births
Living people
Actresses from Seoul
Singers from Seoul
JYP Entertainment artists
South Korean child actresses
South Korean film actresses
South Korean television actresses
South Korean television personalities
South Korean female idols
STAYC